Quinnipiac River Historic District is a  historic district straddling the Quinnipiac River in the Fair Haven and Fair Haven Heights neighborhoods of New Haven, Connecticut.  It encompasses most of the historic maritime village of Fair Haven, with a history dating back to the 18th century.  It was listed on the National Register of Historic Places in 1984.  At that time it included 524 contributing buildings, an inland wetland at the mouth of Hemingway Creek on the northeast corner of the district, and the Grand Avenue Swing Bridge over the Quinnipiac River connecting Fair Haven with Fair Haven Heights at the center of the district.

The historic Fair Haven village developed beginning in the early 18th century, around a ferry crossing of the Quinnipiac River, now the site of the Grand Avenue bridge.  It was a mainly agricultural outpost of New Haven, whose development was further spurred by the construction of the first bridge on that site in 1790.  A few taverns and houses surviving in the district from this period.  Owners of waterfront properties adjacent to extensive mudflats engaged in the harvesting and processing of oysters, which became a major economic activity in the area by the mid-19th century.  Fair Haven was annexed to New Haven in 1871, and subsequently participated in that city's industrial expansion, developing in part as a streetcar suburb while still focused on oyster processing and related industries.

Gallery

See also
National Register of Historic Places listings in New Haven, Connecticut

References

External links

East Haven Preservation Trust: Quinnipiac River Historic District, with text adapted from NRHP application document plus gallery of 8 photos
Quinnipiac River Village

National Register of Historic Places in New Haven County, Connecticut
Italianate architecture in Connecticut
Greek Revival architecture in Connecticut
Queen Anne architecture in Connecticut
Fair Haven (New Haven)
Historic districts on the National Register of Historic Places in Connecticut